Richard Richardson may refer to:
 Richard Richardson (British politician) (1664–1714), M.P. for Ipswich
 Richard Richardson (botanist) (1663–1741), English physician and botanist
 Richard Richardson (general) (1704–1780), American Revolutionary War General
 Richard Richardson (Canadian politician) (1820–1885), Ontario political figure
 Richard Richardson (Australian politician) (1825–1913), member of the Victorian Legislative Assembly
 Richard J. Richardson (born 1935), American political scientist
 Richard Richardson (tennis) (1852–1930), British tennis player
 Richie Richardson (born 1962), West Indies cricketer

See also
Dick Richardson (disambiguation)